Mannina hagnoleuca is a moth in the subfamily Arctiinae first described by Harrison Gray Dyar Jr. in 1916. It can be found in Mexico.

References

Arctiini
Monotypic moth genera
Moths of Central America